Martin Matúš (born 9 March 1982) is a Slovak football player who currently plays for Dunajská Streda, on loan from FK REaMOS Kysucký Lieskovec.

FK Dukla Banská Bystrica
On 10 February 2012, Matúš has signed half-year contract for Slovak club Dukla Banská Bystrica. On 4 March 2012, Matúš made his Slovak Corgoň Liga debut for FK Dukla Banská Bystrica and scored his first goal against AS Trenčín, a 2–2 away draw.

References

External links
 
 

1982 births
Living people
Association football forwards
Slovak footballers
MŠK Žilina players
MŠK Rimavská Sobota players
Podbeskidzie Bielsko-Biała players
Ruch Radzionków players
FK Dukla Banská Bystrica players
FC DAC 1904 Dunajská Streda players
Slovak Super Liga players
Expatriate footballers in Poland
Sportspeople from Žilina